Walter Eaton (1881 – 15 May 1917) was an English professional football right back who played in the Football League for The Wednesday.

Personal life 
Eaton served as a private in the York and Lancaster Regiment and the Royal Northumberland Fusiliers during the First World War and died of wounds in France on 15 May 1917. He was buried in Étaples Military Cemetery.

Career statistics

References

1881 births
1917 deaths
Footballers from Sheffield
English footballers
English Football League players
Association football fullbacks
Sheffield Wednesday F.C. players
Rotherham County F.C. players
British Army personnel of World War I
York and Lancaster Regiment soldiers
British military personnel killed in World War I
Royal Northumberland Fusiliers soldiers
Rotherham Town F.C. (1899) players
Midland Football League players
Burials at Étaples Military Cemetery
Military personnel from Sheffield